Tang Xiaotian (born June 2, 1991) is a Chinese actor and model. He is best known for his roles in Put Your Head on My Shoulder (2019), To Get Her (2019) and My Little Happiness (2021).

Early life and education
Tang Xiaotian was born on June 2, 1991, in Tianjin, China. He graduated from Beijing Institute of Fashion Technology.

Career
Tang made his acting debut in the 2017 web series Forever Young where he played Hu Kankan, Xie Ruolin's brother.

In February 2019, he joined the recurring cast of the series Queen Dugu where he played Yang Yong, the Crown Prince of Sui, the eldest son of Emperor Yang Jian and Empress Dugu Jialuo who is later stripped of his title. In April of the same year, he portrayed the role of Fu Pei in the drama Put Your Head on My Shoulder. On December, he joined the main cast of the series To Get Her where he played Tu Siyi, a famous idol who is trapped in a video game, where he loses all his memories and becomes the 3rd prince.

In 2020, Tang starred as the male lead in Tencent Video's romantic drama series Way Back Into Love.

In January 2021, he played the lead role of Wen Shaoqing in the romcom drama series My Little Happiness. The same year Tang joined the recurring cast of the drama The Sword and The Brocade where he played Ou Yanxing / Lin Shixian. In July, he played Jiang Xiaoye in Broker.

Filmography

Television series

References

External links

Chinese male television actors
21st-century Chinese male actors
1991 births
Living people
Male actors from Tianjin